Susan Power (born 1961) is an American author from Chicago, Illinois. Her debut novel, The Grass Dancer (1994), received the 1995 Hemingway Foundation/PEN Award for Best First Fiction.

Early life and education
Susan Power was born in Chicago, Illinois and is an enrolled member of the Standing Rock Sioux Tribe. Her mother, Susan Kelly Power (Gathering of Stormclouds Woman, in Dakota), is also an enrolled member. Her great-grandmother was Nellie Two Bear Gates. She is a descendant of Sioux Chief Mato Nupa (Two Bears). Her father, Carleton Gilmore Power, is of New England Euro-American descent and worked as a salesman in publishing. One of his great-great-grandfathers was governor of New Hampshire. She heard stories that inspired her imagination from both sides. Power attended local schools, then earned her bachelor's degree from Harvard University and a JD from Harvard Law School.

Change to writing
After a short career in law, Power decided to become a writer. She worked as a technical writer and editor, reserving her creative writing for off hours. In 1992 she entered the MFA program at the Iowa Writer's Workshop.

Her 1994 debut novel, The Grass Dancer, has a complex plot about four generations of Native Americans, with action stretching from 1864 to 1986.  The work received the 1995 Hemingway Foundation/PEN Award for Best First Fiction.

Power has written several other books as well. Her short fiction has been published in the Atlantic Monthly, Paris Review, Voice Literary Supplement, Ploughshares, Story, and The Best American Short Stories 1993. She teaches at Hamline University in St. Paul, Minnesota.

Works
The Grass Dancer, Putnam, 1994.
Strong Heart Society, Penguin, 1998.
Roofwalker, Milkweed Editions, 2002.
Sacred Wilderness, Michigan State University Press, 2014.

References

Further reading
Botrhner, Amy Bunting. "Changeable Pasts: Re-Inventing History" DAIA 5149 (1997): vol.57, no.12, Sec. A. Pittsburgh U.
Kratzert, M. "Native American Literature: Expanding the Canon," in Collection Building Vol. 17, 1, 1998, p. 4.
Shapiro, Dani. "Spirit in the Sky: Talking With Susan Power," People Weekly, 8 August 1994: vol. 42, no.6, 21–22.
Walter, Roland. "Pan-American (Re) Visions: Magical Realism and Amerindian Cultures in Susan Power's 'The Grass Dancer,' Gioconda Belli's 'La Mujer Habitada,' Linda Hogan's 'Power,' and Mario Vargas Llosa's 'El Hablador'," American Studies International (AsInt) vol.37, no.3, 63-80 (1999).
Wright, Neil H. "Visitors from the Spirit Path: Tribal Magic in Susan Power's The Grass Dancer," Kentucky Philological Review (KPR) vol.10, 39-43 (1995).

External links
Susan Power, Native American Writers Project
Susan Power: Biography and criticism of work, Voices from the Gap, University of Minnesota

1961 births
Living people
Native American women writers
Harvard Law School alumni
Standing Rock Sioux people
Native American writers
Iowa Writers' Workshop alumni
Writers from Chicago
Hemingway Foundation/PEN Award winners
21st-century American women
21st-century Native American women
21st-century Native Americans
20th-century Native American women
20th-century Native Americans
Harvard College alumni